Love's Gonna Get You may refer to:

 "Love's Gonna Get You" (Freeez song), 1983
 "Love's Gonna Get You" (Jocelyn Brown song), 1985
 "Love Is Gonna Get You", a 2004 song by Macy Gray
 Love's Gonna Get Ya!, a 1986 album by Ricky Skaggs
 Love Is Gonna Get You (album), a 2007 album by Ben E. King
 Love Is Gonna Getcha, a 1990 album by Patti Austin